SMS S116  was a  of the Imperial German Navy that served during the First World War. The ship was built by Schichau at Elbing in Prussia (now Elbląg in Poland), and was completed in March 1903. The ship was torpedoed and sunk by the British submarine  on 6 October 1914.

Construction and design
The S90-class consisted of 48 torpedo-boats, built between 1898 and 1907 by Schichau and Germaniawerft for the Imperial German Navy. They were larger than previous German torpedo-boats, allowing them to work effectively with the High Seas Fleet in the North Sea, while also being large enough to act as flotilla leader when necessary, thus eliminating the need for separate larger division boats.

S116 was one of a group of six torpedo boats built by Schichau between 1902 and 1903. She was launched from Schichau's Elbing shipyard on 14 October 1902 and commissioned on 28 March 1903.

While the S90-class were of similar size to contemporary foreign torpedo-boat destroyers, the German navy saw their role as primarily torpedo attack against opposing fleets, rather than defending their own fleet against attack, so the ships had a lighter gun armament than British destroyers, and a lower silhouette to avoid detection during night attacks. S116 had a gun armament of three 5 cm SK L/40 guns in single mounts, while torpedo armament consisted of three single 450 mm torpedo tubes (one in a well deck between the raised forecastle and the bridge, with the remaining two tubes aft of the bridge. Two reload torpedoes were carried. The ship had a complement of 49 officers and men.

Service
In May 1904 S116 was part of the 6th Torpedo-boat Division of the 1st Torpedo-boat Flotilla, while in 1907, she was listed as part of the 8th Half-flotilla of the 2nd School Flotilla,  remaining part of the 8th Half-Flotilla in 1908. In 1910, she was listed as part of the 9th Half-Flotilla of the 5th Torpedoboat Flotilla, remaining there until 1912. In 1913 S116 was fitted with new boilers. In 1914, S116 formed part of the 7th Half-Flotilla of the 4th Torpedo-boat Flotilla.

S116 remained part of the 7th Half-Flotilla on the outbreak of the First World War in August 1914. The submarines had already left base when the surface part of the operation had been cancelled. E9 fired two torpedoes at S116, one of which hit the torpedo boat, which broke in two and quickly sank. Nine of S116s crew were killed, with S117 and  rescuing the survivors. E9 escaped successfully.

Notes

References

Bibliography
 

 

 

Torpedo boats of the Imperial German Navy
World War I torpedo boats of Germany
1902 ships
Ships built in Elbing
Ships built by Schichau
Maritime incidents in October 1914
World War I shipwrecks in the North Sea